William Roy Dawnay-Mould (2 November 1901 – 5 March 1985) was an English-born Australian politician.

Dawnay-Mould was born in Hither Green, Kent, and was educated privately and at St Dunstan's College. Whilst in England, he was a member of the Conservative Party.

In 1921, he emigrated to Melbourne, Australia and became a real estate agent and auctioneer. From 1946 to 1948, he served as a councillor on Sandringham City Council.

At the 1947 Victorian state election, he was elected to the Victorian Legislative Assembly, representing the Liberal Party, which became the Liberal and Country Party in 1949. In 1952, Dawnay-Mould supported former LCP leader Thomas Hollway and was a member of the "seventy-hour ministry" formed by Hollway in October 1952 as Minister for Health, Minister for Mines and Minister-in-Charge of Housing and Materials. The Governor of Victoria dismissed Hollway's government and called an election at which Dawnay-Mould was defeated. He unsuccessfully contested the by-election for Malvern in August 1953, and was expelled from the Liberal and Country Party for contesting the by-election as a Hollway Liberal.

References

1901 births
1985 deaths
Members of the Victorian Legislative Assembly
Victoria (Australia) local councillors
Australian real estate agents
People educated at St Dunstan's College
British emigrants to Australia
Liberal Party of Australia members of the Parliament of Victoria
Victorian Liberal Party members of the Parliament of Victoria
20th-century Australian politicians